Sir William Evans Morres, 1st Baronet (1710 – 11 October 1774) was an Anglo-Irish politician. 

Morres was the son of Francis Morris, of Castle Morres, County Kilkenny, by Catherine Evans, daughter of Sir William Evans, 1st Baronet. His younger brother was Hervey Morres, who was raised to the Peerage of Ireland as Baron Mountmorres in 1765.

Morres represented Kilkenny City in the Irish House of Commons from 1752 to 1768, before sitting for Newtownards between 1769 and his death in 1774. Morres was created a baronet, of Upper Wood in the Baronetage of Ireland on 24 April 1758. He was succeeded in his title by his son, Haydock Morres.

References

1710 births
1774 deaths
18th-century Anglo-Irish people
Irish MPs 1727–1760
Irish MPs 1761–1768
Irish MPs 1769–1776
Baronets in the Baronetage of Ireland
Mayors of Kilkenny
Members of the Parliament of Ireland (pre-1801) for County Down constituencies
Members of the Parliament of Ireland (pre-1801) for County Kilkenny constituencies